London Blackout Murders is a 1943 American crime film directed by George Sherman and written by Curt Siodmak. The film stars John Abbott, Mary McLeod, Lloyd Corrigan, Lester Matthews, Anita Sharp-Bolster and Louis Borel. The film was released on January 15, 1943, by Republic Pictures.

Plot
A young girl, Mary Tillet, is forced to find a new place to live due to her London home being bombed during World War II. Her tobacconist landlord, Jack Rawling, portrayed by actor John Abbott, tries to help her turn her new apartment into a home. Meanwhile, the newspapers are reporting news of the "London Blackout Murders," a murder spree being committed against a ring of suspected Nazi spies, and Mary must determine if her kind landlord is an assassin.

Cast   
John Abbott as Jack Rawlings
Mary McLeod as Mary Tillet
Lloyd Corrigan as Inspector Harris
Lester Matthews as Oliver Madison
Anita Sharp-Bolster as Mrs. Pringle
Louis Borel as Peter Dongen 
Billy Bevan as Air Raid Warden
Lumsden Hare as Supt. Neil
Frederick Worlock as Eugene Caldwell 
Carl Harbord as George Sandleigh 
Keith Hitchcock as Village Constable
Tom Stevenson as Police Doctor
Emory Parnell as Henryk Peterson

References

External links
 

1943 films
1940s English-language films
American crime films
1943 crime films
Republic Pictures films
Films directed by George Sherman
Films set in London
American black-and-white films
1940s American films